The Evolution is a compilation album by musicians of Nigerian record label Made Men Music Group. It was released on 29 May 2014. The album's production was primarily handled by Selebobo, along with additional production from Tekno and DJ Coublon. The Evolution was mixed and mastered entirely by Selebobo; it's title is a reference to the evolution of the Nigerian music industry.

Track listing

Personnel

Ubi Franklin – executive producer
Iyanya Onoyom Mbuk – executive producer, primary artist
Emma Nyra – primary artist
Selebobo – primary artist, record 
Tekno – primary artist, record producer
Dj Coublon - Record Producer
Baci – primary artist
Abinibi – album art
Paul Ukonu – photography

Release history

References

2014 compilation albums
Record label compilation albums
Albums produced by Selebobo
Albums produced by DJ Coublon